Manaqib Ale Abi Talib is a book written by the Shi'a Muslim scholar Ibn Shahr Ashub.

Author
Abu Jafar Muhammad Ibn Ali Ibn Shahr Ashub or Ibn Shahraˆshuˆ b(489-588 lunar/1096-1192) was an Imami theologian and jurist of Mazandaran  in Persia. He had the reputation of being the greatest Shiite scholar of his time and was highly thought of even by the Sunnis. he was known as Rashid Al din And Ezza Al-Din. He also wrote books such as Al Maalim.

Subject
The book is on virtues and characters of Muhammad, twelfth Imams, and companions of Muhammad.

Motive
The Author mentioned reasons for writing the book such as Challenge between Shia and Sunni on Imamate or leadership, distorted narrations by some narrators on the subject of Imamate of Ali.

Authenticity
The book is admired by both Shia and Sunni scholars and referred by both of them.

Content
Some of the contents of the book are as follow:
 Section on Our Sayyed the apostle of Allah
 Section on Imamate or leadership
 Section on Grades of Ali
 Section on Virtues of Ali
 Section on Virtues of Fatima

Ibn Shahr Ashoub also mentioned sections allocated to each Imam from Hasan Ibn Ali to Imam Hasan al-Askari. The book ordered in 4 volumes as follow:
 the First volume is concerned with Muhammad's life including prophecy, wars, etc.
 the Second volume is concerned with virtues and characters of Ali, also to cruelties against the household of Muhammad chronologically.
 the third volume is concerned with Muhammad's sayings on Ali's successorship and reported miracles.
 the fourth volume is concerned to the life of other Shiite Imams from second Imam Hasan bin Ali to eleventh Imam Hasan Askari.

Character
There is no chapter or section on twelfth Imam Mahdi, in turn, was a significant theological subject in the period.
There is no chapter on companions of Muhammad while the author said he will allocate a section on the subject.

Books on Al Manaqib
Summarizing the book, two other books have been written by the name of Nokhab al Manaqib for household of Ali and Nahj al Iman both of them by Hoesin ibn Jobayr.

Publication
The book was first published in Mumbai, India, and next published in Iran, Iraq and Pakistan many times.

External links
 https://books.google.com/books?id=sx1bqgibKhQC&pg=PA370&lpg=PA370&dq=ibn+shahrashub&source=bl&ots=D1REXVFSg6&sig=gfVH1tjrdGuVNh4x3ZXWyr_hUI4&hl=en&sa=X&ei=UxrBU-61FYXkOqGfgdAN&ved=0CCcQ6AEwAQ#v=onepage&q=ibn%20shahrashub&f=false
 http://muse.jhu.edu/login?auth=0&type=summary&url=/journals/journal_of_shia_islamic_studies/v005/5.4.pierce.html

References

Shia hadith collections
Ali
Shia bibliography